San Marino competed at the 2012 European Athletics Championships held in Helsinki, Finland, between 27 June to 1 July 2012. One male competitor took part in one event.

Results

Men
Field events

References
 

2012
Nations at the 2012 European Athletics Championships